David L. Cohen (born 1955) is an American businessman, attorney, lobbyist, and diplomat who is the United States ambassador to Canada. He previously served as the senior advisor to the CEO of Comcast Corporation. Until January 1, 2020, he was senior executive vice president and chief lobbyist for Comcast. He also served as chairman of the board of trustees for the University of Pennsylvania and was chief of staff to former Philadelphia Mayor Ed Rendell.

Early life and education
Born to a Jewish family in New York, Cohen graduated from Swarthmore College, in 1977, where he triple-majored in political science, history, and economics. In 1981, he graduated with a J.D. from the University of Pennsylvania Law School.

Career

Cohen served as chief of staff to Philadelphia Mayor Ed Rendell, from January 1992 to April 1997. According to a 2021 article in The Philadelphia Inquirer, during his time as chief of staff, Cohen was "famous for reining in unions representing city workers during Philadelphia's bankruptcy in 1992". In 1998, he served as the chief negotiator for SEPTA during a 40-day labor strike conducted by the Transport Workers Union of America. He was a partner in Ballard, Spahr, Andrews & Ingersoll. In July 2002, he became EVP of Comcast Corporation, dealing with corporate communications, government affairs, public affairs, corporate administration, and serving as senior counsel to the CEO.

He was named to the PoliticsPA "Power 50" list of politically influential individuals in 2002 and 2003. The Pennsylvania Report named him to the 2003 "The Pennsylvania Report Power 75" list of influential figures in Pennsylvania politics, noting that "No one–in or out of government–is closer to Ed Rendell than Cohen." In 2009, he was included in "The Pennsylvania Report 100" list of influential figures in state politics, noting him as "one Philadelphian that all statewide Dems should know." In 2010, Politics Magazine named him one of the "Top 10 Democrats" in Pennsylvania. Philadelphia magazine listed him as the third-most powerful person in Philadelphia and the top "Connector", whose "influence knows no limits", in its 75 Most Influential People Right Now list in 2014.

In February 2013, Cohen endorsed sitting Republican Governor Tom Corbett's failed re-election bid.

Ambassador to Canada 
On July 21, President Joe Biden announced his intent to nominate Cohen as the United States ambassador to Canada. The Senate Foreign Relations Committee held hearings to examine Cohen's nomination on September 22, 2021. The committee favorably reported his nomination to the Senate floor on October 19, 2021. Cohen was officially confirmed by the Senate in a voice vote on November 2, 2021.

Cohen was ceremonially sworn in by Vice President Kamala Harris on December 1, 2021. On December 7, 2021, he presented his credentials to Governor General Mary Simon.

References

External links
 Comcast Executive Bio

1955 births
Living people
Ambassadors of the United States to Canada
American business executives
Businesspeople from Philadelphia
Comcast people
Jewish American attorneys
Pennsylvania lawyers
Swarthmore College alumni
University of Pennsylvania Law School alumni